Leachman is a surname. People with the name include:

Andrew Leachman (1945–2017), a New Zealand master mariner and writer
Cloris Leachman (1926–2021), an American actress
Gerard Leachman (1880–1920), a British soldier and intelligence officer
Kristin Leachman, an American contemporary artist
Lamar Leachman (1932–2012), an American football coach
Silas Leachman (1859–1936), an American pioneer recording artist
Siobhan Leachman, a New Zealand citizen scientist and Wikipedian

Fictional characters
Sara and Joe Leachman, characters in Andy Warhol's Bad